This is a list of broadcast television stations that are licensed in the U.S. state of Florida.

Full-power stations
VC refers to the station's PSIP virtual channel. RF refers to the station's physical RF channel.

Defunct full-power stations
Channel 10: WPST-TV - ABC - Miami (8/2/1957-11/13/1961)
Channel 13: WETV - ETV - Key West (1989-1990)
Channel 15: WPFA-TV - DuMont - Pensacola (10/16/1953-12/18/1955)
Channel 17: WITV - ABC, DuMont - Fort Lauderdale (12/1/1953-5/11/1958)
Channel 19: WTVI - CBS - Fort Pierce (11/23/1960–2/10/1961, 9/10/1961–1/6/1962)
Channel 21: WIRK-TV - West Palm Beach - (8/31/1953–3/1/1956)
Channel 23: WFTL-TV → WGBS-TV - NBC - Fort Lauderdale, Miami (5/5/1953-4/13/1957)
Channel 36: WJHP-TV - Jacksonville (12/13/1953-10/25/1957)
Channel 38: WSUN-TV - ABC/Ind. - St. Petersburg (5/31/1953-2/23/1970)

LPTV stations

Translators

See also
 Florida media
 List of newspapers in Florida
 List of radio stations in Florida
 Media of cities in Florida: Fort Lauderdale, Gainesville, Jacksonville, Key West, Lakeland, Miami, Orlando, St. Petersburg, Tallahassee, Tampa
 List of Spanish-language television networks in the United States

Bibliography

External links
 
  (Directory ceased in 2017)
 Florida Association of Broadcasters
 
 
 
 
 
 
 

Florida

Television